James Oliphant Fraser (October 2, 1826 – February 14, 1904) was a businessman and political figure in Newfoundland. He represented Fortune Bay in the Newfoundland and Labrador House of Assembly from 1878 to 1885.

He was born in Saint John, New Brunswick, one of ten sons and a daughter of Catherine and Donald Allan Fraser, coming to Newfoundland in 1842 when the family relocated to St. John's for Rev. Donald Fraser to take up his post as the first Presbyterian minister in Newfoundland. James established his own business in St. John's in 1846. He was a member of the Legislative Council of Newfoundland from 1864 to 1878. He served as chairman of the Board of Works from 1879 to 1882 and as surveyor general from 1882 to 1885. After he retired from politics, Fraser was Postmaster General from 1885 to 1902. He died in St. John's at the age of 77.

His son James Oliphant Fraser, Jr. also served in the Newfoundland assembly.

References 
 

Postmasters General of Newfoundland
Members of the Newfoundland and Labrador House of Assembly
Members of the Legislative Council of Newfoundland
1826 births
1904 deaths
Newfoundland Colony people